Methacrylic anhydride is a liquid which reacts with water exothermically.

It can also react with hydroxyl- and amino-groups present in some organic compounds leading to covalent attachment of methacryloyl moieties. These functional groups could be successfully used either in subsequent polymerisation or reactions with thiols. For example, chitosan modified by methacryloylation exhibits better ability to adhere to mucosal surfaces (mucoadhesion) due to its reactivity with thiols groups present in cysteine domains of mucins ).

Uses
Methacrylic anhydride is used as an intermediate agent in plastics material and resin manufacturing.

References

Carboxylic anhydrides